Firewater is the fourth full-length studio album released by indie rock band Silkworm. It was engineered by Steve Albini, who worked on most of the band's albums and singles. The album was recorded and released two years after guitarist/vocalist Joel RL Phelps left the band, leaving the remaining members to record the album as a trio. It was the band's first album released on Matador Records.

Track listing
"Nerves" - 2:59
"Drunk" - 3:05
"Wet Firecracker" - 2:03
"Slow Hands" - 5:27
"Cannibal Cannibal" - 2:41
"Tarnished Angel" - 5:08
"Quicksand" - 3:11
"Ticket Tulane" - 3:31
"Swings" - 3:04
"Severance Pay" - 3:11
"The Lure of Beauty" - 4:05
"Miracle Mile" - 4:14
"Drag The River" - 3:08
"Killing My Ass" - 4:48
"Caricature of a Joke" - 3:20
"Don't Make Plans This Friday" - 5:20

Personnel
Silkwater
Andy Cohen — guitar, vocals on 1, 4, 6, 10, 14, 16
Michael Dahlquist — drums
Tim Midyett — bass, vocals on 2, 3, 5, 7, 8, 9, 11, 12, 13, 15
Steve Albini — engineer

References

1996 albums
Silkworm (band) albums
Matador Records albums
Albums produced by Steve Albini